AWJ may refer to:

 Abrasive waterjet, a kind of water jet cutter
 Association of Women Jurists, in Human rights in the Central African Republic

See also
Awj, a village in northern Syria